MathTime (sometimes MathTıme) is a Times-style mathematical typeface for TeX, created by Michael Spivak. MathTime has been widely adopted by academic publishers such as by Elsevier, American Physical Society, and Springer. A distinguishable symbol in this font is the integral sign which appears in many mathematical, physical, and engineering journals.

Releases

MathTime 1.x & Plus
These versions were sold by (the now defunct) Y&Y.

Version 1.x contains math fonts (including italics) and symbols, while Plus added bold and "heavy" (extra bold) styles.

MathTime Professional 2
Released by PCTeX, this is the current version of MathTime. It has a paid version known as Complete and a free version with limited features known as Lite. 

Key features of MathTime Professional 2 include:   

 Three optical sizes, for text (10 pt), super/subscripts (7pt), and second-order super/subscripts (5.5pt) respectively 
 Italic "v" and "w" with rounded bottom
 Alternative italic "z" in the style of Times Linotype (as opposed to the default in the style of Times New Roman)
 Large mathematical operators

The following features are exclusive to the Complete version:

 Bold italics of Greek characters
 Bold and heavy styles of basic math symbols
 AMS symbols, including bold and heavy styles
 Script, blackboard bold, and "holey Roman" (seriffed blackboard bold) fonts

MathTime has its own license (i.e., unrelated to the license of Times New Roman).

Related typefaces 
 Belleek is a metrically identical (but significantly different in shape) free replacement font for MathTime 1.x.  Belleek was released by TrueTeX (Richard Kinch) in 1998. 
 TM Math by MicroPress is another commercial math font
 STIX fonts, XTIS, and TeX Gyre Termes are Times-style math fonts released for free and/or under open source licenses

References

Footnotes

Symbol typefaces
TeX